Roots rock is "a style of rock music that draws material from various American musical traditions including country, blues, and folk." The term is sometimes used in a broader sense to encompass other genres of Americana, including early rock and roll, country rock, and other related forms.

This list includes performers who have been associated with "roots rock" by music reviewers, music historians, or music journalists:

A

Alabama Shakes
The Allman Brothers Band
Amazing Rhythm Aces
Eric Ambel

B

Badlees
The Band
The Blasters
Blind Melon
Ben Harper
Billy Eli

Blue Mountain
BoDeans
Bob Dylan
Bob Seger
Bonnie Raitt
Bottle Rockets
Brian Setzer
Bronze Radio Return
Buddy Miller

C

Calexico
Charlie Daniels
Chris Isaak
Chris Whitley
Counting Crows
Cracker
Creedence Clearwater Revival

D

Dave Alvin
Dawes
The Del-Lords
Dire Straits
The Dirty Guv'nahs
Doug Sahm

E
Eagles

G

The Georgia Satellites
Giant Sand
Golden Smog
Grace Potter and the Nocturnals
Grateful Dead

H

Heartsfield
Hillstomp
Hootie and the Blowfish

J

J.J. Cale
Jill Andrews
John Butler Trio
John Fogerty
John Mellencamp

K

Kansas
Kathleen Edwards
The Killers

L

Larkin Poe
Lee Rocker
The Legendary Shack Shakers
Link Wray
Little Feat
Los Lobos
Lynyrd Skynyrd

M

Mark Knopfler
The Marshall Tucker Band
The Mavericks
Maxim Ludwig & The Santa Fe Seven
Molly Hatchet
Murder by Death

N

Neko Case
Neil Young

P
The Proclaimers

R

Reckless Kelly
Ry Cooder

S

Sally Jaye
Sheryl Crow
The Silos
Skydiggers
Son Volt
Steve Earle
Steve Miller Band
The Steepwater Band
Swinging Steaks
The Subdudes
The Swearengens

T

Train
The Traveling Wilburys

U
Uncle Tupelo

W

The Wallflowers
Webb Wilder
Wilco
Willard Grant Conspiracy
Wolf Mail

Z
ZZ Top

See also
Southern rock
Heartland rock

References

Roots rock
Roots rock